Étienne Jacob ( – 1726) was a Canadian court officer, sergeant of the Sovereign Council of New France, seigneurial notary and a judge of the bailiff's court of Beaupré and Île d'Orléans.

External links

1640s births
1726 deaths
Canadian judges
18th-century Canadian judges